Espersen is a surname. Notable people with the surname include:

Lene Espersen (born 1965), Danish politician
Mikael Espersen, Danish lightweight rower
Ole Espersen (1934–2020), Danish politician
Søren Espersen (born 1953), Danish politician, journalist, and writer

Danish-language surnames